Mount Tamborine is a town within the locality of Tamborine Mountain in South East Queensland, Australia.

History
Mount Tamborine Post Office opened by March 1924 (a receiving office had been open from 1881, originally known as Tambourine Mountain), was renamed Mount Tamborine in 1926 and closed in 1977.

The name "Tamborine" is taken from the Yugambeh language for "wild lime", after the finger lime trees in the area. Tamborine was sometimes spelt as "tchambreem", "jambreen" and "goombireen".

Formerly a suburb in its own right, in 1997, Mount Tamborine was merged with other former suburbs North Tamborine and Eagle Heights to create the larger locality of Tamborine Mountain. All three suburbs now have the postcode 4272 and postal address of Tamborine Mountain. The postcode 4271 is reserved for the Post Office at Eagle Heights.

At the  Mount Tamborine had a population of 1,184. There has not been any census data reported for the town of Mount Tamborine after 2006.

Sport and recreation
A number of well-known sporting teams represent the local area, including the Tamborine Mountain Bushrats, the rugby league club who play home games at Tamborine Mountain Sports Complex

Heritage listings 
Mount Tamborine has a number of heritage-listed sites, including:
 Geissmann Drive: Tamborine Mountain Road

See also

Tamborine National Park

References

Towns in Queensland
Tamborine Mountain